Big Grove Township may refer to the following townships in the United States:

 Big Grove Township, Kendall County, Illinois
 Big Grove Township, Benton County, Iowa
Big Grove Township, Johnson County, Iowa